A first-in-class medication is a pharmaceutical that uses a "new and unique mechanism of action" to treat a particular medical condition. While the Food and Drug Administration's Center for Drug Evaluation and Research tracks first-in-class medications and reports on them annually, first-in-class is not considered a regulatory category. Although many first-in-class medications qualify as breakthrough therapies, Regenerative Medicine Advanced Therapies and/or orphan drugs, first-in-class status itself has no regulatory effect.

Examples

Controversy

Safety 
By definition, a first-in-class drug does not have the safety evidence from analogous products that not-first-in-class drugs would have. However, a study investigating recalls and warnings in relation to first-in-class drugs approved between 1997 and 2012 by Health Canada has found that first-in-class drugs actually have a more favourable benefit-to-harm ratio.

Economics 
First-in-class drugs are often seen as commercially more attractive as they may tap into a market segment that has hitherto been underserved, but this may be illusory. In fact, most blockbuster drugs (drugs with annual sales revenues exceeding ) were not first-in-class drugs. The economic potential of a first-in-class drug, which is typically priced higher than later drugs in the same class, has been largely declining due to efforts by health insurers to restrict what specialty drugs are covered and prevent incumbency advantages.

Costs 
A lower number of available therapeutic options correlates with higher prices. In addition, many first-in-class medications are specialty drugs and orphan drugs, which means that manufacturers have to recoup development costs from a smaller market. This raises ethical questions about the sustainability of the high prices on these costs.

References 

Pharmaceuticals policy
Food and Drug Administration
Pharmaceutical regulation in the United States